Jerzy Zawisza (born 19 December 1943 in Borek Wielki) is a Polish politician. He was elected to Sejm on 25 September 2005, getting 5338 votes in 15 Tarnów district as a candidate from the Samoobrona Rzeczpospolitej Polskiej list.

See also
Members of Polish Sejm 2005-2007

External links
Jerzy Zawisza - parliamentary page - includes declarations of interest, voting record, and transcripts of speeches.

1943 births
Living people
People from Ropczyce-Sędziszów County
Self-Defence of the Republic of Poland politicians
Members of the Polish Sejm 2005–2007